Splendrillia acostata is a species of sea snail, a marine gastropod mollusk in the family Drilliidae.

Distribution
This marine species is endemic to Australia and occurs off South Australia and Western Australia

References

 Verco, J.C. 1909. Notes on South Australian marine Mollusca with descriptions of new species. Part XII. Transactions of the Royal Society of South Australia 33: 293-342
 Hedley, Charles (1920), A revision of the Australian Turridae; Records of the Australian Museum, vol. XIII nr. 6, Sydney
 Wells, F.E. 1990. Revision of the recent Australian Turridae referred to the genera Splendrillia and Austrodrillia. Journal of the Malacological Society of Australasia 11: 73-117 
  Tucker, J.K. 2004 Catalog of recent and fossil turrids (Mollusca: Gastropoda). Zootaxa 682:1–1295.

External links
 

acostata
Gastropods of Australia
Gastropods described in 1909